A motor fuel is a fuel that is used to provide power to the motor in motor vehicles.

Currently, the majority of motor vehicles worldwide are powered by gasoline or diesel. Other energy sources include ethanol, biodiesel, propane, compressed natural gas (CNG), electric batteries, and hydrogen (either using fuel cells or combustion). There are also cars that use a hybrid of different power sources. The use of alternative fuels is increasing, especially in Europe.  Before deciding on a particular fuel type, some factors should be considered:
 The profitability of a solution. 
 The workload in relation to one's own driving performance - if someone drives short distances, he will have very little benefit for himself and the environment.
 The refueling / charging infrastructure should be sufficiently developed so that one can use its vehicle flexibly without worry about finding a filling station.

See also
Alternative fuel vehicle
Biofuel
Ethanol fuel
Fuel gas
Fuel oil
Diesel fuel

References

Fuels